Gaël Quérin (born 26 June 1987 in Lille) is a French athlete competing in the decathlon.

Competition record

Personal bests

Outdoor
100 m – 11.12 (0.7 m/s) (Shenzhen 2011)
400 m – 47.84 (Toruń 2011)
1500 m – 4:10.47 (Toruń 2011)
110 m hurdles – 14.34	(0.3 m/s) (Montreuil-sous-Bois 2007)
400 metres hurdles – 52.47 (Dreux 2006)
High jump – 2.00 m (Götzis 2012)
Pole vault – 5.00 m (Helsinki 2012)
Long jump – 7.56 m (0.4 m/s) (Helsinki 2012)
Shot put – 13.37 m (Kladno 2011)
Discus throw – 41.04 m (Arras 2009)
Javelin throw – 56.77 m (Villeneuve-d'Ascq 2007)
Decathlon – 8098 pts (Helsinki 2012)
Indoor
60 m – 7.09 (Eaubonne 2008)
400 m – 48.86 (Liévin 2011)
1000 m – 2:33.49 (Paris 2010)
60 m hurdles – 7.98 (Liévin 2009)
High jump – 2.01 m (Aubière 2011)
Pole vault – 4.80 m (Torino 2009)
Long jump – 7.49 m (Aubière 2011)
Shot put – 13.10 m (Aubière 2011)
Heptathlon – 5923 pts (Aubière 2011)

External links
 

1987 births
Living people
French decathletes
Universiade medalists in athletics (track and field)
Sportspeople from Lille
Universiade silver medalists for France
Medalists at the 2011 Summer Universiade